This is a list of foreign-born people who became samurai in Japan.

Definition 
In this list, Japan means the Japanese archipelago. The word samurai has had a variety of meanings historically; here it is taken to mean 'those who serve in close attendance to the nobility'.
This list includes the following people.

 Foreign soldiers and generals who served daimyō directly during the Sengoku period (1467–1615) and Azuchi-Momoyama period (1568-1600) before the unification of Japan by Toyotomi Hideyoshi. In this period, many emerging forces like Jizamurai call themselves samurai. Hideyoshi himself was born as a son of a peasant-ashigaru. The definition of samurai was obscure in those periods
 The Tokugawa shogunate did not confiscate swords from farmers and townspeople, who could continue to wear daisho until 1683. Many would keep wearing wakizashi on a daily basis after then. After the middle of the 18th century, they were still worn during special events such as travel, weddings, and funerals. This lasted until the Meiji Restoration.
 Foreign-born people who served the Tokugawa shogun and were granted a status higher than Hatamoto. 
 In the Edo period (1603-1867), foreign-born people who served daimyō and granted a status higher than koshō (:ja:小姓, page).
 In the Edo period, foreign-born people who served daimyō and were given salary of koku

The following people are treated as "people who could be foreign-born samurai".

 "Foreign-born samurai" whose existence is uncertain.
 Foreign-born people who served samurai, whose occupations were unclear.
 Foreign-born people who were given territory or rice as salary by lords, whose occupations were unclear.

This list excludes the following people.
 Samurai of foreign ancestry born in Japan.
 Foreign-born people who served samurai and allowed to wear two swords but was not given territory or salary of koku.  All men from samurai class were permitted to wear daishō. However, people from other social classes were sometimes allowed to wear swords. For example, Hijikata Toshizō, the famous swordsman and vice-commander of Shinsengumi was born as a son of a farmer. Even though he wore daishō and engaged in police activity, he couldn't gain the title of the official retainer of bakufu until 1867.
 Foreign-born people who served samurai in other occupations, for example Confucianist or medical doctor.
 Foreign-born people who served samurai as oyatoi gaikokujin, not Japanese-style soldiers.

Foreign-born samurai

People who could be foreign-born samurai 

Foreign-born people who were given a territory.
 Kawaminami Rishin (汾陽理心): Retainer of the Shimazu clan, who was given 597 koku. He was born as 郭国安 (Japanese pronunciation: Kaku Kokuan) in the Ming dynasty. He made a journey to Japan in 1559. Later he was scouted by Shimazu Yoshihisa, daimyō of Satsuma as retainer. During the Imjin war, he went to Joseon as the officer in charge of letters. He was said to hold secret communications with Ming at that time. Later, he served the Satsuma domain using his medical knowledge. In 1598, Rishin appeared in Chinese document as Japanese general.
 Kyo Gigo (許儀後): Physician to Shimazu Yoshihisa, who was given 410 koku. He was the bureaucrat of Jiangxi of the Ming dynasty. In 1571, he was captured by wokou, and brought to Satsuma Province. He was scouted by Yoshihisa there. He went to Joseon with him during the Imijin war.

Other possible foreign-born samurai

 Yamashina Katsunari (山科勝成): He was born in Italy and served Gamō Ujisato as retainer. It is said that the Gamō clan sent an embassy to Rome with the help of Katsunari. But his existence is highly questioned.
 Kawasaki Seizō: Born as 李達越 in Joseon. His courtesy name was 宗歓. During the Imjin war, he was active from behind as a Japanese spy. As reward, he was allowed to wear swords and given salary by Naoshige. Later he became a merchant, and built a town in Saga now called Toujinchō.
 Hoshiyama Chūji:Born as 金海(Kim Hae) in Joseon. He was a potter brought to Japan by Shimazu clan. He was the founder of Satsuma ware and allowed to wear two swords.
 Akizuki Tanenobu: Born as Park Won-hyuk (朴元赫) in Joseon. Page (koshō) of Chōsokabe. After Chōsokabe clan had been removed from Tosa province, he became a renowned Korean style tofu merchant.
 Ryō Murin (梁夢麟): He was born in Joseon. He seemed to be a Chabōzu (choreman) of Wakisaka Yasuharu. In 1617, he returned to Joseon.
 Inpuku (允福): Son of 慎忠義 (Japanese pronunciation: Shin Chūgi), military officer of Joseon. He was a eunuch. Captured during the Imjin war, he won the favor of Tokugawa Ieyasu. He seemed to be the page of Ieyasu.
 Okada Hanzaemon (岡田半左エ門): During the Imjin war, he was brought up by Mōri Motomasa, and became a close adviser of his. But later he was expelled because of a fight and injury.
 unknown: Mori Shimanokami, navy officer of Hachisuka clan had a retainer born in Joseon.
 Watanabe Kotonori (渡辺士式): Born as 孟二寛 (Japanese pronunciation: Mō Jikan) in the Ming Dynasty, he served the Asano clan using his medical knowledge. His grandson, Takebayasi Takashige was a member of the Forty-seven Ronin.
  Jules Brunet (1838–1911) – was a French officer who fought for the shōgun in the Boshin War. Originally a foreign advisor, a oyatoi gaikokujin, part of the French military mission to Japan, he later resigned his post from the French Army and with a number of other former French officers, officially joined the shogunate. He was the main inspiration behind the character of Captain Nathan Algren in the 2003 movie The Last Samurai.
  André Cazeneuve (December 10, 1817 - August 20, 1874) was a French soldier, a horse trainer in the Guard of Emperor Napoleon III with the rank of corporal. Following the outbreak of the Boshin War, he resigned from the French army and entered the service of the shōgun, along with Jules Brunet. He was commissioned as a captain.
  François Bouffier (1844–1881) was a French non-commissioned officer, who in the advent of the Boshin War, and the declaration of neutrality of foreign powers, chose to resign from the French Army and continue the fight on the side of the Bakufu.
  Jean Marlin (1833–1872) was a French sergeant of the 8th Infantry Battalion. He worked as an instructor for infantry in the army of the shōgun, later resigning form the French Army, officially joining the Bakufu.
  Eugène Collache (29 January 1847 in Perpignan – 25 October 1883 in Paris) was French Navy officer who fought in Japan for the shōgun during the Boshin War. Noted for wearing a kimono, while japanese samurai transitioned to more western style uniforms.
  Arthur Fortant (June 14, 1829 - April 10, 1901) was a sergeant of the French Regiment of the Guard of the field artillery. He resigned from the French Army and joined the Bakufu.
  Henri Nicol (birth and death unknown) is a French Navy officer who came to Japan at the end of the Tokugawa shogunate. Nicol was tasked with organizing the Navy.

See also
 Foreign ninja
 French military mission to Japan (1867–68)
 Denrinbō Raikei

References

Foreign
Expatriates in Japan